The women's 100m butterfly S12 event at the 2008 Summer Paralympics took place at the Beijing National Aquatics Center on 9 September. There were two heats; the swimmers with the eight fastest times advanced to the final.

Results

Heats
Competed from 09:55.

Heat 1

Heat 2

Final
Competed at 18:10.

Q = qualified for final. PR = Paralympic Record.

References
 
 

Swimming at the 2008 Summer Paralympics
2008 in women's swimming